Christopher Vance (5 November 1986 – 13 December 2016) was a Group One-winning New Zealand Standardbred racehorse, trained by Roy and Barry Purdon and generally driven by Barry Purdon or Tony Herlihy.

He was the 1991–92 New Zealand Horse of the Year after winning both the major New Zealand races, the New Zealand Cup and Auckland Cup, as well as the Miracle Mile Pace at Harold Park in Australia. Christopher Vance was not as dominant in the following seasons but remained competitive against top class opposition such as Blossom Lady, Master Musician, Jack Morris and Chokin.

During his retirement years, Christopher Vance lived at Cambridge Stud, where he was a companion to the champion thoroughbred Rough Habit. The two were buried next to each other, Christopher Vance dying a month past his 30th birthday.

Racing record

During his career, Christopher Vance won or was placed in the following major races in New Zealand and Australia:

 1st - 1990 Great Northern Derby beating Mark Hanover and Amos Lee.
 2nd - 1990 Auckland Cup behind The Bru Czar and Tight Connection third.
 1st - 1991 Noel J Taylor Memorial Mile beating Mark Hanover and Franco Ice.
 1st - 1991 New Zealand Messenger beating Franco Ice and Mark Hanover.
 1st - Nov 1991 New Zealand Trotting Cup beating Clancy and Surmo Way.
 1st - Nov 1991 Miracle Mile Pace beating Defoe and Westburn Grant.
 1st - Dec 1991 Auckland Cup beating Starship and The Bru Czar.
 3rd - Nov 1992 New Zealand Trotting Cup behind Blossom Lady and Giovanetto, with a 15-metre handicap and breaking at the beginning of the race. 
 3rd - Nov 1992 New Zealand Free For All behind Blossom Lady and Sogo.
 2nd - Nov 1992 Miracle Mile Pace behind Franco Tiger, with Jack Morris third.
 3rd - Dec 1992 M. H. Treuer Memorial behind Jack Morris and Band Magic.
 2nd - Dec 1992 Auckland Cup behind Master Musician with The Bru Czar third.
 4th - 1993 Inter Dominion Pacing Championship behind Jack Morris, Warrior Khan and Blossom Lady. In the heats he had one win (beating Master Musician and Warrior Khan) in 1:54.5 for the mile, a 2nd placing behind Blossom Lady and a 3rd placing behind Jack Morris and Rustic Lad.  
 3rd - Dec 1993 Auckland Cup behind Chokin and Franco Ice.
 2nd - Feb 1994 A G Hunter Cup behind Blossom Lady and The Unicorn third.
 1st - March 1994 Inter Dominion Pacing Championship Consolation final beating Our New Life and Tact Rashad.
 3rd - Dec 1994 Auckland Cup behind Chokin and Franco Ice.

From April to August 1995 Christopher Vance was driven in a number of Australian races by Brian and Darren Hancock, only managing to win two lesser events. He was then brought back to New Zealand to race but failed to manage a top three placing in his final campaign.  His last race was a sixth placing in the Courier Post Flying Mile (Group 2) at Cambridge behind Victor Supreme on 16 February 1996.

See also
 Harness racing in New Zealand

References

1986 racehorse births
2016 racehorse deaths
Auckland Pacing Cup winners
Miracle Mile winners
New Zealand standardbred racehorses
New Zealand Trotting Cup winners